Madness of It All is the debut studio album from the British pop-rock band The Ward Brothers, which was released by Siren in 1987.

The album was not a commercial success, but two of its singles were UK chart entries; "Cross That Bridge" reached No. 32 in December 1986 and "Why Do You Run?" peaked at No. 81 in April 1987. In the US, "Cross That Bridge" reached No. 32 on the Billboard Hot Dance Club Play chart. The title track was featured in the Miami Vice episode "Love At First Sight".

Critical reception

Robin Denselow of The Guardian picked the "light and tuneful" "Cross That Bridge" as the best song on the album, adding: "The rest of the LP sounds classy but anonymous; it's full of throbbing synthesised ballads, with a little funk and even a fashionable burst of electro-heavy metal thrown in. Decidedly forgettable." Billboard noted Dave Ward's "distinctive chops", but felt the "fairly straightforward pop material has a way to go before dividends will be accrued".

Cash Box listed the album as one of their feature picks during February 1987. They described the album as an "impressive debut" with "largely crafty dance-oriented rock". Jack Lloyd of The Philadelphia Inquirer wrote: "Though the material is a bit uneven, there are a couple of above-average numbers such as "Over the Border" and "Cross That Bridge". The obvious flaw with a band like this is that what it does is fine, but what it does is not especially exciting."

Track listing

Personnel
The Ward Brothers
 Dave Ward - lead vocals, backing vocals, drums, percussion, arranger
 Derek Ward - keyboards, programming, arranger
 Graham Ward - guitar, backing vocals, arranger

Additional musicians
 Martin Bullard - synth bass, keyboards
 Wesley Magoogan - saxophone (track 1)
 Louis Resto - bass (track 9), additional keyboards (track 9)

Production
 Mike Howlett - producer
 Steve Power - engineer
 Don Was - producer (tracks 8, 9)
 Frank Filipetti - producer (track 9), engineer (track 9)
 Phil Brown - engineer (track 8)
 Ian Gillespie - digital editing
 Denis Blackham - digital EQ, digital mastering
 Kevin Metcalfe - direct metal mastering

Other
 The Design Clinic - design
 Paul Cox - photography

References

1987 debut albums
Virgin Records albums
A&M Records albums
Albums produced by Mike Howlett
Albums produced by Don Was
Albums produced by Frank Filipetti